Virginia's musical contribution to American culture has been diverse, and includes Piedmont blues, jazz, folk, brass, hip-hop, and rock and roll bands, as well as the founding origins of country music in the Bristol sessions by Appalachian Virginians.

The origin of music from within the state is very diverse, including cities such as Richmond, college towns such as Charlottesville and Fredericksburg, and the rural areas of Southwestern Virginia along "The Crooked Road”.

State song
"Carry Me Back to Old Virginny" by James A. Bland was Virginia's state song from 1940 until 1997; it now has emeritus status. "Oh Shenandoah" was the interim state song from January 2006, and its melody was used for "Our Great Virginia," with lyrics by Mike Greenly, which became the official state song in 2015. The same year, "Sweet Virginia Breeze," written in 1978 by Steve Bassett and Robbin Thompson became the official popular state song; the runner-up was "Virginia, the Home of My Heart".

Birthplace of Southern shape note music 
 In 1816 Ananias Davisson of Rockingham County published a shape note tunebook containing folk melodies collected during his travels, entitled Kentucky Harmony. At a time when the musicians in the North were turning to Europe and ridiculing the composers of the First New England School, Davisson's focus on grassroots regional music was widely imitated in the South.

Notable music artists from Virginia by genre
One of Virginia's most famous musical contributions is the country singer Patsy Cline.  Several towns claim her as their own, including Gore and Winchester.  Winchester is home to several Patsy Cline attractions, including a driving tour published by the local Chamber of Commerce, and the Kurtz Cultural Center/Old Town Visitor's Center, which shows various Cline memorabilia. The Golden Gate Quartet founded in 1931 are widely regarded as the founders of jubilee and the sound of many male vocal groups that came after them. Their musical influence crosses multiple genres including gospel, jazz, blues, hip hop, soul and R&B. The legacy continues on through a new version of the Golden Gate in France and former lead singer Charles West from Chesapeake, Virginia.

Jim & Jesse McReynolds and the Virginia Boys, Ralph Stanley, Hobart Smith, The Statler Brothers, and The Carter Family are award-winning bluegrass and country musicians from Virginia. Ella Fitzgerald and Pearl Bailey were both from Newport News. Hip hop and rhythm and blues acts like Missy Elliott, Timbaland, The Neptunes, Clipse, Chad Hugo, Nottz, Young Dez and Bink hail from the commonwealth. The Neptunes produced 43% of all songs on American radio in 2003. Singer-songwriters from Virginia include Jason Mraz and jam bands like the Pat McGee Band and Dave Matthews Band (violinist Boyd Tinsley attended the University of Virginia), who continue their strong charitable connection to Charlottesville, Virginia. Influential stage-rock group GWAR as well as heavy metal group Lamb of God began at Virginia Commonwealth University. Alternative Rock group Seven Mary Three formed at The College of William and Mary in Williamsburg.

Multi-Platinum certified artists are in bold.

Blues and jazz
 Pearl Mae Bailey  – vocalist, actress, Newport News
James "Plunky" Branch  – saxophonist; Oneness of JuJu, Ornette Coleman, Sun Ra, from Richmond
 Karen Briggs – improvising violinist (featured with Yanni), Portsmouth
 Rob Brown – saxophonist and composer, Hampton
 Ruth Brown – singer, songwriter, actress, musician, Portsmouth
 Charlie Byrd – jazz guitarist, Suffolk 
 Robert Cray – blues guitarist, Newport News
Walter Davis Jr.  – bebop and hard bop pianist, Richmond 
 Archie Edwards – Piedmont blues guitarist from Union Hall
 Ella Fitzgerald – jazz singer, Newport News
 Tiny Grimes – jazz and R&B guitarist, Newport News 
 The Holmes Brothers  – blues, jazz, gospel, from Christchurch
 Claude Hopkins – jazz  stride pianist, from Alexandria
 Cliff Jackson – jazz stride pianist, from Culpeper
 John Jackson – Piedmont blues musician, Woodville 
René Marie  – vocalist, Warrenton
 Tommy Newsom – musician in Johnny Carson's The Tonight Show Band, Portsmouth
 Don Pullen – avant-garde jazz pianist from Roanoke
 Keely Smith – jazz singer, actress, Louis Prima collaborator, Norfolk
 Lonnie Liston Smith  – pianist, keyboardist; Pharoah Sanders, Miles Davis, Stanley Turrentine, Rahsaan Roland Kirk, Betty Carter, Max Roach, from Richmond
 Steve Wilson – saxophonist; Chick Corea, Dave Holland, Lionel Hampton, from Hampton
 Victor Wooten – bass virtuoso, member of Béla Fleck and the Flecktones, Hampton

Country and bluegrass

 Kenny Alphin – of the country group Big & Rich, b. Culpeper
 Tim Barry – frontman of Avail, and country/folk singer-songwriter, Richmond
 Dock Boggs – singer, banjo player, Norton
 The Carter Family – highly influential 1920s and 1930s country trio, known as the "First Family of Country Music", Maces Spring
 Neko Case – country singer, b. Alexandria
 Roy Clark – country music artist, Meherrin
 Patsy Cline – country music singer, b. Winchester (d.1963, buried in Winchester)
 Steve Earle – country-rock musician and songwriter, b. Hampton
 Grit City Grass – A bluegrass band that pulls influences from modern and classic bluegrass sources, Charlottesville
 Jim & Jesse – bluegrass duo, Coeburn
 Scott Miller – alternative country singer-songwriter, also of The V-Roys and Scott Miller & The Commonwealth, Augusta County
 Old Crow Medicine Show – Americana/folk band formed by Ketch Secor and Critter Fuqua in Harrisonburg
 Old Dominion – country band, Roanoke
 River City Gang – country-rock band, Richmond
 Gary Ruley and Mule Train – Rockbridge County
 Mary Simpson – violinist, Charlottesville
 Canaan Smith – country singer, Williamsburg
 Hobart Smith – banjo virtuoso, Saltville
 Kilby Snow – autoharpist, Grayson County
 The Stanley Brothers – influential bluegrass duo made up of brothers Carter Stanley and Ralph Stanley, Dickenson County
 The Statler Brothers – country-rock-gospel band, Staunton
 The Steel Wheels - folk and Americana, Harrisonburg
 Ricky Van Shelton – country singer, Pittsylvania County
 Phil Vassar – country singer and songwriter, Lynchburg
 Walker's Run, Lexington
 Wade Ward – banjo player, fiddler, Independence
 Mac Wiseman, born in Crimora

Pop, rock and heavy metal
 Alabama Thunderpussy – mainstream rock, metal band, Richmond
 Arsis – death metal band, Virginia Beach
 Artful Dodger – power pop, Fairfax
 Avail – punk band, Richmond
 Bad Omens - metalcore, Richmond
 Broadside – pop-punk band, Richmond
 Carbon Leaf – Celtic-infused rock, Richmond
 Car Seat Headrest - Indie rock, lo-fi pop, originally formed in Leesburg as solo project of Will Toledo and eventually became a band.
 City of Caterpillar – screamo/post rock, Richmond
 Clarence Clemons – saxophonist for Bruce Springsteen's E Street Band, Norfolk
 Stewart Copeland – drummer for rock band The Police and jazz ensemble Animal Logic, Alexandria
 Days Difference – pop-rock band, Virginia Beach
 Parachute – indie-rock band, Charlottesville
 Tim Be Told – contemporary Christian-rock band, Charlottesville
 Dave Matthews Band – jam band, Charlottesville. Had 7 consecutive No. 1 albums on the Billboard 200.
 The Dreamscapes Project – acoustic rock, Reston
 The Downtown Fiction – Fairfax
 Mark Oliver Everett – lead singer, guitarist, and keyboardist of Eels
 Neil Fallon – stoner rock, singer for the band Clutch
 The Friday Night Boys – Fairfax
 Glass Cloud – metalcore Hampton
 Dave Grohl – Nirvana and Foo Fighters drummer, guitarist and lead singer – grew up in Burke/Springfield
 Down To Nothing – hardcore-punk band, Richmond
 Eternal Summers – dream pop band, Roanoke
 Gigantic Brain – experimental metal-grindcore band
 GWAR – thrash metal, art rock band, Richmond
 The Last Bison – indie-folk band, Chesapeake
 Labradford – ambient/drone/post-rock band, Richmond
 Lamb of God – heavy-metal band, Richmond
 Jake E. Lee – heavy/glam metal guitarist, Ratt, Dio, Ozzy Osbourne, Mandy Lion
 Bill Leverty – guitarist for Firehouse, Richmond
 Michael Foster— drummer for Firehouse, Richmond
 Mae – pop-rock, Norfolk
 Aimee Mann – punk, new wave, adult contemporary, Richmond
 Janis Martin – rockabilly, country, rock and roll, Sutherlin
 Scott McKenzie – mainstream folk, singer-songwriter, Alexandria
 Moutheater – noise rock/sludge/punk, Norfolk
 Jason Mraz – acoustic pop-rock, Mechanicsville
 Municipal Waste – Thrash Crossover band, Richmond
 Pig Destroyer – grindcore band, Alexandria
 RDGLDGRN, rap-rock, Reston
 Satan's Satyrs, heavy/doom/punk rock, Herndon (later Richmond)
 Suzy Saxon and the Anglos – new wave band, Richmond
 Seven Mary Three – alternative rock, post-grunge band, Williamsburg
 Matt Sharp – original Weezer bass guitarist, The Rentals, grew up in Arlington
 Strike Anywhere – punk rock/melodic hardcore band, Richmond
 Scott Travis – heavy metal drummer for Judas Priest, Norfolk
 Kali Uchis – singer and songwriter, Alexandria
 Gene Vincent and the Blue Caps from Norfolk
 Will Toledo – Car seat headrest – grew up in Leesburg
 Windhand – Doom Metal band, Richmond

Hip hop
Nick Mira – producer and songwriter, Richmond
Skillz – rapper and songwriter, Richmond
Chris Brown – Hip-hop and R&B singer, actor, dancer/entertainer "The Prince of R&B", Tappahannock, Virginia. Had 2 No. 1 Hot 100 hits, like "Run It!" in 2005.
 Clipse (No Malice and Pusha T) – rap/hip-hop duo, Virginia Beach
 Danja – record producer/songwriter,Virginia Beach
 D'Angelo – R&B singer, Richmond. Had a No. 1 Billboard 200 album in 2000.
 DeVante Swing – producer/singer, founder of R&B group Jodeci, Hampton
 Dalvin DeGrate – singer, member of Jodeci, Hampton
 Krohme - record producer/songwriter, Alexandria
 K-R.O.K. – Record producer, recording artist , singer-songwriter, Pop/hip-hop duo  P.M. Dawn , Virginia Beach
 Missy Elliott – hip-hop and R&B singer "The Queen of Rap", Portsmouth
 Lee Major – Music Producer/Songwriter, Petersburg
Nickelus F – rapper, Richmond
 Lex Luger – producer, Suffolk
 Nottz – producer and rapper, Norfolk
Big Pooh – rapper (Little Brother), Dumfries
 Pharrell Williams – producer, rapper, singer-songwriter, Virginia Beach. Had a No. 1 Hot 100 hit with "Happy" in 2014.
Eric Stanley – violinist and composer, Chesapeake
Solciety – producer/artist group 
 The Neptunes (Pharrell and Chad Hugo) – hip hop, R&B and pop producer/artist duo
 N.E.R.D (Pharrell, Chad Hugo, and Shay Haley) – rock, funk, and hip hop band
Trey Songz – R&B singer, Petersburg. Had 2 No. 1 Billboard 200 albums in 2012 and 2014.
 Timbaland – rapper and producer, Norfolk. Had two No. 1 Hot 100 hits, like "Give It to Me" in 2007.
Pusha T – rapper and songwriter, Virginia Beach
Lady Of Rage – rapper, Farmville
Bink! - record producer/songwriter, Norfolk

Other

 Pearl Bailey – Broadway singer, Newport News
 Gary "U.S." Bonds – singer and songwriter, Norfolk
 Ann Marie Calhoun – violinist, Gordonsville
 Bill Deal and the Rhondels are from Virginia Beach
 Bruce Hornsby – singer, pianist and songwriter, Williamsburg. Had a No. 1 Hot 100 hit with "The Way It Is" in 1986. He went to the University of Richmond.
 Toby Mac – of DC Talk, Christian hip hop, rap, rock, Fairfax. Had a No. 1 Billboard 200 album in 2012.
 Michael Tait – of DC Talk (1997–2001), Newsboys (2009–present). Contemporary Christian artist, Washington DC.
 Undine Smith Moore – composer, Jarratt
 Wayne Newton – a.k.a. "Mr. Las Vegas"; singer and songwriter, Roanoke
 Ketch Secor and Critter Fuqua of Old Crow Medicine Show, Harrisonburg
 Robbin Thompson – Richmond
 Keller Williams – one-man jam band from Fredericksburg
Hilary Hahn – Grammy-award-winning classical violin soloist, Lexington

Music venues and institutions

For larger concerts and events, Virginia has the Ferguson Center for the Arts (Christopher Newport University) in Newport News, Va, Jiffy Lube Live in Bristow (marketed as D.C. for most tours), the Veterans United Home Loans Amphitheater at Virginia Beach in Virginia Beach, the Richmond Coliseum, the Hampton Coliseum and the Norfolk Scope. Vienna is home to the Wolf Trap National Park for the Performing Arts, the only national park for the arts in the United States. Wolf Trap features a large outdoor amphitheatre, the 7,000 seat Filene Center, as well as a smaller indoor venue called The Barns.  The Old Dominion Opry is another major venue, located near Colonial Williamsburg, a popular tourist attraction.

Virginia's other prominent music venues include The Birchmere in Alexandria, a local country and bluegrass club where Mary Chapin Carpenter performed early in her career. The Landmark Theater in Richmond and the Harrison Opera House in Norfolk both host the Virginia Opera.  Phase 2 (the former Cattle Annie's, but significantly remodeling in 2010) is a popular, large club venue in Lynchburg with a reputation for attracting prominent performers. Garth Newel Music Center in Hot Springs was once a farm that is now known for classical, jazz, and blues concerts with gourmet meals and views from the side of Warm Springs Mountain. The Shenandoah Valley Music Festival celebrated its 50th anniversary of summer concert in 2013 and continues to draw people to the tiny Shenandoah County village of Orkney Springs.

Richmond's 929 West Grace Street has housed a punk and rock-oriented club nearly uninterrupted for nearly three decades. Most famously known as Twisters throughout the 1990s, more recently the building has been known as Club 929, The Nanci Raygun, and Bagel Czar before re-opening in 2009 as Strange Matter. Like its predecessors, Strange Matter hosts up-and-coming local and national touring acts nearly every night. Alley Katz in Richmond continues to have regular shows. Toad's Place accommodated midsized bands in 2007 and 2008 but closed shortly after that time. Another midsized venue is The National, which holds around 1,500 people.

The Hampton Roads area also has several more intimate venues. The most prominent of them is the Norva Theatre, which is a small club-style venue for smaller to mid-size acts.

The Shenandoah Valley hosts a few smaller venues. The mockingbird in downtown Staunton hosted a 168-seat newly renovated grass roots and acoustic music hall, but closed early in 2013. Clementine café in downtown Harrisonburg has cemented itself as the premier venue in the valley.

In the late 1960s and the 1970s, the Alexandria Roller Rink hosted many festival style concerts, among which, bands like Yes, Jethro Tull, and many others appeared.

The Virginia Musical Museum & Virginia Music Hall of Fame in Williamsburg, VA. opened in 2013.  The museum and hall of fame displays instruments, memorabilia, pictures and history of Virginia music artists.  New Virginia artists are inducted into the Virginia Music Hall of Fame each year.

Music festivals
FloydFest is a popular music festival which is not actually within Floyd County but in the county just next to Floyd called Patrick County. This is a bit of FloydFest trivia that mostly the locals know about.  The festival began in 2002 and features camping and a wide range of music from bluegrass, rock, reggae, folk, zydeco, African, and Appalachian.

In 2005, 2006, and 2007, Richmond hosted the National Folk Festival that features Virginia-area regional folk music as well as folk musicians from around the world. Many previous NFF sites have continued to conduct a regional folk festival when the NFF moves to the next site and Richmond has done the same in the form of the Richmond Folk Festival.

The Virginia Blues & Jazz Festival was started in 2006 at Garth Newel Music Center in Hot Springs.  It is held each June and has featured national acts like Taj Mahal, The Dirty Dozen Brass Band, Buckwheat Zydeco, and Eric Lindell.

The MACRoCk festival happens the beginning of April every year in Harrisonburg VA. It has featured national acts like
MewithoutYou, Q and Not U, Fugazi, The Faint, Archers of Loaf, Dismemberment Plan, Sufjan Stevens, Prefuse 73, Mates of State, The Wrens, Converge, Antibalas Afrobeat Orchestra, Of Montreal, Norma Jean, The Dillinger Escape Plan, Superchunk, Elliott Smith, An Albatross, Coheed and Cambria, Avail, and Engine Down.

The Blue Ridge Rock Festival, a Hard Rock/Heavy Metal music festival has been held in Virginia since 2017. It has been held each year except for 2020 due to Covid-19. The festival was held at DeVault Vineyards in Concord, VA in 2017 and 2018, at Oak Ridge in Arrington, VA in 2019, at White Oak Mountain Amphitheater in Blairs, VA in 2021, at Virginia International Raceway (VIR) in Alton, VA in 2022. It is scheduled to be held at VIR again in 2023.

Blue Ridge mountain music
Southwest Virginia is, along with western North Carolina, part of the Blue Ridge area, home to a distinctive style of old-time music sometimes called "mountain music", which is a vibrant tradition most famously celebrated through an annual series of festivals. Galax is a small town that is home to the Old Fiddlers' Convention, held since 1935; it is the largest and oldest festival of old-time Appalachian music in the country. The Convention has given Galax the nickname the "Capital of Old-Time Mountain Music". The Convention attracts upwards of 20,000 visitors to witness many of the most renowned American folk, country and bluegrass performers, as well as regional stars.  Galax and the surrounding area has long been a rich part of American, and Virginian music, and is known for an intricate fiddling style and instrumental and vocal traditions; music collectors like Peter Seeger and Alan Lomax visited Galax and recorded the region's music.

Though the Galax Old Fiddlers' Convention is a major focal point for the Blue Ridge's vibrant folk music scene, the region is home to a major music festival season, which is inaugurated by the late March Fairview Ruritan Club Fiddlers' Convention, which hosts a major regional competition in several categories. Ferrum College in Ferrum is home to the annual Blue Ridge Folklife Festival, which has been held every October since 1973.  The White Top Mountain–Mount Rogers area is home to the Wayne Henderson Music Festival & Guitar Competition, as well as a number of regional festivals, with mountain music as a major part of the White Top Mountain Molasses Festival, the White Top Mountain Maple Festival, and the White Top Mountain Ramp Festival. The aforementioned FloydFest always features bluegrass and traditional Appalachian mountain music.  Local mountain music festivals in Virginia abound in small towns like Fries, Wytheville, Troutdale, Vesta, Stuart, Bassett, Baywood and Elk Creek, as well as at the Grayson Highlands State Park near Mouth of Wilson.

Farther southwest, The Carter Family Fold, in the Carter Family hometown of Hiltons, hosts an annual folk music festival as well as weekly concerts. Johnny Cash often visited the Hiltons area and The Fold with his wife, June Carter Cash. In fact, Johnny Cash's last public performance was at The Fold in the summer of 2003. The area around the Virginia and Kentucky border, folk, country and bluegrass remains a vital regional tradition. Norton is home to the Virginia Kentucky Opry and a historic music venue called the Country Cabin, while local festivals include the Doc Boggs Festival (in Wise), and the Ralph Stanley's Annual Memorial Weekend Bluegrass Festival.[1]

Country music
Virginia's contributions to country music include the legendary singer Patsy Cline, pioneering performers The Carter Family and Staunton's Statler Brothers, who were one of the most popular country acts in the country in the 1970s and 1980s.

Bristol, TN/VA has been designated by Congress as the 'Birthplace of Country Music'.  In 1927 record producer Ralph Peer of Victor Records began recording local musicians in Bristol, to attempt to capture the local sound of traditional "folk" music of the region. One of these local sounds was created by the Carter Family, which got its start on July 31, 1927, when A.P. Carter and his family journeyed from Maces Spring, Virginia, to Bristol to audition for Ralph Peer, who was seeking new talent for the relatively embryonic recording industry. They received $50 for each song they recorded. That same visit by Peer to Bristol also resulted in the first recordings by Jimmie Rodgers. These 1927 sessions became known as the Big Bang of Country Music.  Since 1994, the Birthplace of Country Music Alliance has promoted the city as a destination to learn about country music and the city's role in the creation of an entire music genre. Currently, the Alliance is organizing the building of a new Cultural Heritage Center to help educate the public about the history of country music in the region.

The Bristol Rhythm & Roots Reunion is held every September on State Street in Downtown Bristol and celebrates the city's contribution to country music. It has grown to become one of the more popular music festivals in Virginia and the Appalachia region, as close to 50,000 people attended the festival in 2012.

Hardcore punk and heavy metal

The city of Richmond has long had one of the more active punk rock scenes on the East Coast.  The city is perhaps best known for shock-punk-metal band GWAR, known for wild on-stage antics.  GWAR grew out of Death Piggy, a hardcore punk band that followed in the footsteps of local scene leaders White Cross, Beex, and The Prevaricators. However Richmond punk became big with Avail. The Richmond punk scene grew, including: Inquisition, Fun Size, Knucklehed, Uphill Down, Four Walls Falling, The Social Dropouts, Ann Beretta, Sixer, River City High, BraceWar, Smoke or Fire (originally from Boston), Strike Anywhere,and many underground bands. Richmond punk is often mistakenly considered to be an offshoot of the D.C. scene, however Richmond punk bands have developed a unique sound, often influenced by country, folk, and southern rock (particularly prevalent in Avail, Sixer, and Ann Beretta, and to a lesser degree in Strike Anywhere). This is most likely due to the fact that Richmond, the capital of the Confederacy during most of the Civil War, is arguably the oldest and most lively punk scene in the South. Richmond punk has a close relationship with punk from Gainesville, Florida, particularly between Avail and the now-disbanded Hot Water Music. Other hardcore bands from Richmond included Unseen Force, God's Will, Graven Image, and Honor Role. Richmond also has an active metal scene that includes, in addition to GWAR, Lamb of God, Alabama Thunderpussy, Municipal Waste. The metal scene is closely related the city's punk rockers, and, like the punks, there is a Southern influence in the music of Lamb of God and particularly in Alabama Thunderpussy. Richmond still harbors an extremely strong hardcore scene, emerging from the shadows of the mid-1980s Four Walls Falling, Fed Up, Set Straight, Step Above, Count Me Out and Dead Serious. More recently a resurgence of old school hardcore punk has risen from Richmond with such bands as Direct Control, Government Warning, Wasted Time, etc. Richmond also has a small post-hardcore scene with bands such as Remaniscense, Wow, Owls! and Ultra Dolphins.

Norfolk was known, during hardcore's heyday, for violent clashes between punks and local military personnel from the Navy base. Ray Barbieri (Agnostic Front, Warzone) and John Joseph McGeown (Cro-Mags) became punks while serving in Norfolk after a judge's order.

See also
Indigenous music of North America#Eastern Woodlands

The Virginia Musical Museum & Virginia Music Hall of Fame opened in 2013.  Patsy Cline,  Wayne Newton,  Ella Fitzgerald,  The Carter Family, Roy Clark, Bruce Hornsby, Pearl Baily and Ralph Stanley were the founding inductees.

Notes

References
 
 
 

 
Virginia
Virginia
Music scenes